Hobart Clinton "Rabbit" Whitman (December 2, 1897 – February 1969) was an American professional baseball player.

Career 
An outfielder, Whitman spent his career in minor league baseball. He spent eleven of his fourteen professional seasons in the International League and was inducted into the International League Hall of Fame in 2008.

Personal life 
In 1931, Whitman married Agnes Krobath.

References

External links

1897 births
1969 deaths
People from Tobaccoville, North Carolina
Baseball players from North Carolina
Minor league baseball players
Baseball outfielders